Mr. Vocalist 3 is the ninth studio album by American singer-songwriter Eric Martin. Released on November 3, 2010 exclusively in Japan by Sony Music Japan, the album features more of Martin's English-language covers of popular female-oriented Japanese songs. It includes "Sekaijū no Dare Yori Kitto", a duet with Debbie Gibson; an alternate recording of the song is included in Gibson's 2010 cover album Ms. Vocalist.

The album peaked at No. 51 on Oricon's albums chart.

Track listing

Charts

References

External links
 
 
 

2010 albums
Eric Martin (musician) albums
Sony Music Entertainment Japan albums
Covers albums